Rockton Township is located in Winnebago County, Illinois. As of the 2010 census, its population was 16,441 and it contained 6,822 housing units.

Geography

Demographics

References

External links
City-data.com
Winnebago County Official Site

Townships in Winnebago County, Illinois
Rockford metropolitan area, Illinois
Townships in Illinois